V.6: The Gift, the twelfth mixtape by American rapper Lloyd Banks, was released on July 24, 2012 for free download. The mixtape features confirmed guest appearances from Young Chris, Vado, Fabolous, Jadakiss and Schoolboy Q. It also includes production from Automatik, Doe Pesci, Superiors, A6, V Don, Beat Butcher, Tha Jerm and Cardiak.

Background
The name was inspired from his tenth mixtape, V.5 released on December 28, 2009 with DJ Whoo Kid also member of G-Unit. The first date for release of the mixtape was on his birthday April 30, 2012. However was pushed back with no release date. On July 16, 2012 the site DatPiff announced the new release date would be July 24, 2012. The site it's the same what Banks will provide the mixtape for free download.
On the last track, the rapper announced a new mixtape with DJ Drama of his Gangsta Grillz series. The tape was confirmed to be Failure's No Option, the first volume of the All or Nothing series, which was released on October 31, 2013. As of now, V.6 has over 250k downloads on DatPiff, certifying the mixtape platinum on that site.

Singles
On March 29, 2012, Lloyd Banks released the first official song of the mixtape via his YouTube account. The song, Open Arms, was released later as single at iTunes on March 30, 2012. It was produced by the G-Unit's production team member Doe Pesci.

Track listing

References

External links
Download

2012 mixtape albums
2012 compilation albums
Lloyd Banks albums
Sequel albums
Albums produced by Cardiak